The 2019 Hwaebul Cup was the seventh edition of the  Hwaebul Cup (홰불, Torch) celebrating North Korea's Youth Day.

Ryŏmyŏng were the defending champions.
The winner, Ryŏmyŏng, qualified for the 2020 AFC Cup.

Group stage
The 12 teams were divided into two groups. The group winners and runners-up advanced to the semi-finals.

In Group A, Ryŏmyŏng finished first with five wins and one draw, and Amrokkang finished second with three wins, one draw and two defeats.

In Group B, P'yŏngyang City finished first with four wins and one draw, and Hwaebul finished second with three wins, one draw and one defeat.

Knockout stage

Semi-finals

Third place match

Final

See also
2018–19 DPR Korea Premier Football League

References

DPR Korea Football League seasons
Hwaebul Cup
Cup
Singapore